Johan Martin Jakob von Tengström (1821 in Åbo – 1890) was a Finnish entomologist.

Tengström specialised in Lepidoptera. Tengström visited Java in 1849 where he discovered several new species of Lepidoptera. He made shorter trips within Europe.
His collection is held by the Natural History Museum of Helsinki.

Bibliography

(1869) Catalogus Lepidopterorum Faunae Fennicae praecursorius. Not.Soc.Fauna Flora Fennica 10.

External links
Gaedicke in Groll, E. K. (Hrsg.): Biografien der Entomologen der Welt : Datenbank. Version 4.15 : Senckenberg Deutsches Entomologisches Institut, 2010.
Anonym 1891: [Tengstrom, J. M. J. von] Entomologist's Monthly Magazine (3) Volume 27:111-2 

Finnish entomologists
1821 births
1890 deaths